Dereköy is a village in the Yeniçağa District of Bolu Province in Turkey. Its population is 132 (2021).

References

Villages in Yeniçağa District